The Japanese destroyer {{nihongo|Hayate|疾風|"Gale"}} was one of nine  destroyers built for the Imperial Japanese Navy (IJN). During the Pacific War, she was sunk by American coast-defense guns during the Battle of Wake Island in December 1941, the first Japanese warship to be lost during the war. Only a single man of her crew was rescued.

Design and description
The Kamikaze class was an improved version of the s. They were powered by two Parsons geared steam turbines, each driving one propeller shaft, using steam provided by four Kampon water-tube boilers. During sea trials, the ships comfortably exceeded their designed speeds, reaching . Their crew consisted of 148 officers and crewmen.

The main armament of the Kamikaze-class ships consisted of four  Type 3 guns in single mounts; one gun forward of the superstructure, one between the two funnels and the last pair back to back atop the aft superstructure. The guns were numbered '1' to '4' from front to rear. The ships carried three above-water twin sets of  torpedo tubes; one mount was between the forward superstructure and the forward gun and the other two were between the aft funnel and aft superstructure. Early in the war, the No. 4 gun and the aft torpedo tubes were removed in exchange for four depth charge throwers and 18 depth charges.

Construction and career
Hayate, built at the Ishikawajima Shipyards in Tokyo, was laid down on 11 November 1922, launched on 24 March 1925 and completed on 21 December 1925. Originally commissioned simply as Destroyer No. 13, the ship was assigned the name Hayate on 1 August 1928.

Pacific War
At the time of the attack on Pearl Harbor on 7 December 1941, Hayate was assigned to Destroyer Division 29 under Destroyer Squadron 6 of the 4th Fleet. She sortied from Kwajalein on 8 December as part of the Wake Island invasion force.

As none of the six  coast-defense guns replied, Rear Admiral Sadamichi Kajioka, commander of the invasion forces, ordered his ships to close the island, believing that the American guns had been destroyed by the earlier aerial attacks. Encouraging this, Major James Devereux, commander of the United States Marine garrison, had ordered his men to hold their fire until he gave the order to do so. Battery L, based on Peale Islet, engaged their closest target, Hayate, and hit her on the third salvo. After a large explosion aft, she broke in half and sank within two minutes at coordinates , two miles (3 km) southwest of Wake. The location of the explosion makes it probable that the shells struck one of the aft torpedo mounts, or, less likely, the depth charges on the stern. Only one man from the 169 men aboard was rescued. She was the first warship lost by the Japanese during the war. The quick loss of Hayate and the near misses around his flagship, Yūbari, caused Kajioka to order his forces to disengage.

Notes

References

 

 

Kamikaze-class destroyers (1922)
Ships built by IHI Corporation
1925 ships
World War II destroyers of Japan
World War II shipwrecks in the Pacific Ocean
Maritime incidents in December 1941
Battle of Wake Island
Naval magazine explosions
Ships sunk by coastal artillery